This is a list of rivers in Kosovo in an alphabetical order.

List

Notes

References 

Kosovo
Rivers
Landforms of Kosovo